Charles Richard Moll (born January 13, 1943) is an American actor. He played the role of Aristotle Nostradamus "Bull" Shannon, a bailiff on the NBC sitcom Night Court from 1984 to 1992. He is also known as the voice of Harvey Dent/Two-Face in Batman: The Animated Series and The New Batman Adventures.

Early life
Charles Richard Moll was born in Pasadena, California, the son of Violet Anita (née Grill), a nurse, and Harry Findley Moll, a lawyer. He was tall early in his life, reaching  by age 12. He attended the University of California, Berkeley, and was a member of the Kappa Alpha Order fraternity.

Career
In the 1977 film Brigham, Moll (credited as Charles Moll) appeared as Joseph Smith, founder of the Latter Day Saint movement. Moll would go on to often portray hulking or imposing characters due to his height and deep voice. In 1979, Moll played the part of Eugene, a gangster on the TV series Happy Days in the episode "Fonzie's Funeral". In 1981, Moll co-starred with Jan-Michael Vincent and Kim Basinger in the film Hard Country, and he also played the abominable snowman in the comedy feature film Caveman. The same year, he had a small part in the Mork & Mindy episode "Alienation", where he appeared with future fellow Night Court TV series cast member John Larroquette. In 1982, he played the sorcerer Xusia in The Sword and the Sorcerer.

In 1983, Moll shaved his head for the role of Hurok in the science fiction B movie Metalstorm: The Destruction of Jared-Syn. The producers of the TV sitcom Night Court liked the look so much in his audition that they asked him to keep it. He also used the Bull persona in commercials for Washington's Lottery.

Moll played the role of Big Ben in the 1986 horror film House. He earned a Saturn Award nomination for the role. Moll made an appearance in the first episode of Highlander: The Series as Slan Quince, the villain who reunites Connor MacLeod with his kinsman and the show's protagonist, Duncan MacLeod. Moll made a guest appearance on Babylon 5 in the episode "Hunter, Prey" as a lurker criminal who was holding a VIP hostage, and as a gangster on Married... with Children. Moll made another guest appearance in the TV series Hercules: The Legendary Journeys, playing the cyclops in episode two, "Eye of the Beholder".

In Super Password, Moll appeared with Judy Norton Taylor, Nancy Lane, Markie Post, Gloria Loring, Florence Halop, Debra Maffett, Elaine Joyce, and Kim Morgan Greene, with Bert Convy as the game show's host from 1984 to 1987.

Moll plays himself in The Facts of Life (Season 9, episodes 1 and 2: "Down and Out in Malibu").

Moll appeared in The Flintstones and Casper Meets Wendy, both TV spin-offs. In 1999's But I'm a Cheerleader, Moll went against type and played a gay man who, with his partner (Wesley Mann), helps gay teenagers escape from a nearby camp where parents send their teenage offspring for conversion therapy.

In 2001, he played Hugh Kane, the ghost haunting a mansion in Scary Movie 2. He played the drifter on the Nickelodeon show 100 Deeds for Eddie McDowd. In 2007, he played (along with M. Steven Felty) Kolchak Jefferson Stillwall in Anthony C. Ferrante horror film Headless Horseman. In 2014, Moll appeared as a security guard on an episode of Anger Management with Charlie Sheen.

Voiceover work
Moll can be heard in many animated productions, often as a villain with a deep, growling voice. He has voiced Two-Face in Batman: The Animated Series, Scorpion in later episodes of Spider-Man: The Animated Series (the character was previously voiced by Martin Landau in earlier episodes) and the Abomination in The Incredible Hulk (who was originally voiced by Kevin Schon).

Moll also provided voice work in the Batman: The Brave and the Bold episode "Chill of the Night!" voicing Lew Moxon as well as briefly reprising Two-Face (who was currently voiced by James Remar at the time). His first role in an animated film was as a beat poet in Ralph Bakshi's American Pop. He starred as Norman in the animated series Mighty Max. He also voiced Vorn the Unspeakable, a Cthulhu-like character in the Freakazoid! episode "Statuesque".

Moll voiced the Devil Hulk in the 2005 video game Incredible Hulk: Ultimate Destruction. In the 2010 video game Dante's Inferno, he voiced Death (which he shared with Dee Bradley Baker) and King Minos.

Filmography

Film

Television

Video games

References

External links

 
 

1943 births
Living people
American male film actors
American male television actors
American male video game actors
American male voice actors
Male actors from Pasadena, California
University of California, Berkeley alumni
20th-century American male actors
21st-century American male actors